Abdul Zakaria Mugees (born 27 December 2001) is a Ghanaian professional footballer who plays as a forward for Israeli Premier League side F.C. Ashdod.

Career

Dreams FC 
Mugees started his Ghana Premier League career with Dreams FC in 2018, playing two matches in the first round of the 2018 Ghanaian Premier League, before it was suspended and later cancelled due to the Anas Number 12 scandal.

Techiman Eleven Wonders 
Ahead of the 2019–20 Ghana Premier League season, he signed for Bono-side Techiman Eleven Wonders. On 25 January 2021, he scored his hit debut goal as he scored a second half brace in a match against Karela United that helped the Eleven Wonders win the match by 2–0. He made 13 league match appearances and scored 2 goals before the league was brought to an abrupt end due to the COVID-19 pandemic.

References 

2001 births
Living people
Ghanaian footballers
Dreams F.C. (Ghana) players
Techiman Eleven Wonders FC players
F.C. Ashdod players
Hapoel Ramat Gan F.C. players
Ghana Premier League players
Israeli Premier League players
Liga Leumit players
Ghana youth international footballers
Ghanaian expatriate footballers
Expatriate footballers in Israel
Ghanaian expatriate sportspeople in Israel
Association football forwards